Events of 2020 in Myanmar.

Incumbents 
 President: Win Myint 
 State Counsellor: Aung San Suu Kyi
 First Vice President: Myint Swe 
 Second Vice President: Henry Van Thio

Events 
2 July – At least 162 people were killed in a landslide at the Wai Khar jade mine site in the Hpakant area of Kachin State.

Deaths 
1 May – Tun Tin, 6th Prime Minister (b. 1920).

References 

 
Myanmar